"Step into My World" is a song by Britpop band Hurricane #1. It was released on 28 April 1997 on Creation Records and charted at #29 in the UK Singles Chart. A remix by Perfecto peaked at #19 in the UK Singles Chart in November 1997. It was used as continuity music on Match of the Day in 1997 and 1998.

Track listing 
CD CRESCD 253
 "Step Into My World" - 5:01
 "Don't Look Away" - 3:57
 "Smoke Rings" - 8:35
7" CRE 253
 "Step Into My World" - 5:01
 "Don't Look Away" - 3:57

References

1997 singles
Songs written by Andy Bell (musician)
Song recordings produced by Andy Bell (musician)
1997 songs